Bertish is a surname. Notable people with the surname include:

Chris Bertish (born 1974), South-African-born surfer, adventurer, and motivational speaker
Suzanne Bertish (born 1951), English actress